The Embassy of Kuwait in Washington, D.C. is the diplomatic mission of the State of Kuwait to the United States. It is located in the North Cleveland Park neighborhood.

The Ambassador is Salem Al-Sabah.

References

External links
Embassy of the State of Kuwait, Washington, D.C.
Kuwait Cultural Office website
"Kuwait Embassy in US holds national celebration", KUNA, 2/24/2011  
wikimapia

Kuwait
Washington, D.C.
Kuwait–United States relations
North Cleveland Park